Exercise Strikeback was a major naval exercise of the North Atlantic Treaty Organization (NATO) that took place over a ten-day period in September 1957.

As part of a series of exercises to simulate an all-out Soviet attack on NATO, Exercise Strikeback was tasked with two objectives.  Its initial objective was the deployment of NATO's naval forces (designated the "Blue Fleet") against other NATO forces attempting to simulate an "enemy" navy that featured a large number of submarines (designated the "Orange Fleet").  Its other objective was to have the Blue Fleet execute carrier-based air strikes against "enemy" formations and emplacements along NATO's northern flank in Norway.

Exercise Strikeback involved over 200 warships, 650 aircraft, and 75,000 personnel from the United States Navy, the Royal Navy, the Royal Canadian Navy, the French Navy, the Royal Netherlands Navy, and the Royal Norwegian Navy.  As the largest peacetime naval operation up to that time, military analyst Hanson W. Baldwin of The New York Times said Exercise Strikeback gathered "the strongest striking fleet assembled since World War II."

Operation Strikeback and the other concurrent NATO exercises held during the fall of 1957 would be the most ambitious military undertaking for the alliance to date, involving more than 250,000 men, 300 ships, and 1,500 aircraft operating from Norway to Turkey.

Background

Strategic overview
Faced with the overwhelming numerical superiority of Soviet Union and Warsaw Pact military forces, NATO embraced the concept of the nuclear umbrella to protect Western Europe from a Soviet ground invasion.  This strategy was initially articulated in January 1954 by U.S. Army General and then-Supreme Allied Commander Europe Alfred Gruenther: 

This strategic concept reflected the American strategy of massive retaliation of the Eisenhower administration as set forth by Secretary of State John Foster Dulles:

NATO military command structure

With the establishment of NATO's Allied Command Atlantic (ACLANT) on 30 January 1952, the Supreme Allied Commander Atlantic (SACLANT) joined the previously-created Supreme Allied Commander Europe (SACEUR) as one of the alliance's two principal parts of the NATO Military Command Structure.  In addition, Allied Command Channel  was established on 21 February 1952 to control the English Channel and North Sea area and deny it to the enemy, protect the sea lanes of communication, and Support operations conducted by SACEUR and SACLANT.  The following key NATO military commands were involved in a series of alliance-wide exercises, including Operation Strikeback, during the Fall of 1957.

 Allied Command Atlantic (ACLANT)
 Supreme Allied Commander Atlantic (SACLANT) – Admiral Jerauld Wright, United States Navy
 Deputy Supreme Allied Commander Atlantic (DSACLANT) – Vice-Admiral Sir John Eaton, RN
 Chief of Staff (COFS) – Vice Admiral Harold Page Smith, United States Navy
 Eastern Atlantic Area (EASTLANT) – Vice Admiral Sir John Eccles, RN
 Western Atlantic Area (WESTLANT) – Admiral Jerauld Wright, United States Navy
 Striking Fleet Atlantic (STRIKFLTLANT) – Vice Admiral Robert B. Pirie, United States Navy
Allied Command Europe
 Supreme Allied Commander Europe (SACEUR) – General Lauris Norstad, USAF
 Deputy Supreme Allied Commander Europe (DSACEUR) – Field Marshal The Viscount Montgomery of Alamein, British Army
 Chief of Staff (COFS) – General Courtlandt Van R. Schuyler, USA
 Allied Forces Northern Europe (AFNORTH) – Lieutenant-General Sir C.S. Sugden, British Army
 Allied Forces Central Europe (AFCENT) – Général d'Armée Jean-Étienne Valluy, French Army
 Allied Air Forces Central Europe (AAFCE) – Air Chief Marshal Sir George Holroyd Mills, RAF
 Northern Army Group (NORTHAG) – General Sir Richard Nelson Gale, British Army
 Central Army Group (CENTAG) – General Henry I. Hodes, USA
 Allied Forces Southern Europe (AFSOUTH) – Admiral R.P.M. Bristol, United States Navy
 Naval Striking and Support Forces Southern Europe (STRIKFORSOUTH) – Vice Admiral Charles R. Brown, United States Navy
 Allied Forces Mediterranean (AFMED) – Admiral Sir Ralph Edwards, RN
Allied Command Channel (CHANCOM)
 Commander-in-Chief Channel (CINCHAN) – Admiral Sir Guy Grantham, RN

Operational history
As part of the response to a theoretical Soviet attack against NATO on all fronts, Operation Strikeback would test the capabilities of Allied naval forces (Blue Fleet) by tasking them to destroy the enemy navy (Orange Fleet) and its huge submarine fleet, protect transatlantic shipping, and undertake sustained carrier-based air strikes against the enemy positions.

Beginning on 3 September 1957, American and Canadian naval forces got underway to join British, French, Dutch, and Norwegian naval forces in eastern Atlantic and northern European waters under the overall command of Vice Admiral Robert B. Pirie, United States Navy, Commander, United States Second Fleet, acting as NATO's Commander Striking Fleet Atlantic.  While en route, the U.S.-Canadian naval forces executed Operation Seaspray, a bilateral naval exercise to protect Blue Fleet's vitally-important underway replenishment group (URG) from enemy submarine attacks. The nuclear submarine  and the conventional submarine  completed operations in the Arctic and joined 34 other U.S. and allied submarines temporarily assigned to the Orange Fleet. USS Mount McKinley was based in Portsmouth Naval Base as the command communications base for the Orange forces controlling Comsuborangelant/Comphiborangelant for the duration of the Exercise.

Operation Strikeback itself began on 19 September 1957, involving over 200 warships, 650 aircraft, and 65,000 personnel.

Time magazine provided the following contemporary coverage of Operation Strikeback:

Following the conclusion of Operation Strikeback, U.S. naval forces conducted Operation Pipedown, involving the protection of its underway replenishment group while en route back the United States.

SACLANT Admiral Jerauld Wright, United States Navy,  described Operation Strikeback as being "remarkably successful" while also noting "[that] there is considerable scarcity of both naval and air forces in the eastern Atlantic."  Wright's Eastern Atlantic allied commander, Vice Admiral Sir John Eccles, RN, also noted:

According to naval analyst-historian Norman Friedman, Nautilus "presented a greater threat than all 21 snorkel submarines combined" during Operation Strikeback, making 16 successful attacks against various naval formations while maintaining effective on-station tactical and high-speed pursuit capabilities. Nautilus cruised 3,384 nautical miles (6,267 km) with an average speed of 14.4 knots (26.7 km/h). In addition to the Nautilus, the Seawolf departed New London on 3 September for Operation Strikeback. Before she surfaced off Newport, Rhode Island, on 25 September, Seawolf had remained submerged for 16 days, cruising a total of 6,331 miles (10,189 km). Recognizing the need to meet this Anti-submarine warfare (ASW) challenge, the following actions were taken:

 Task Force Alfa was created  by the U.S. Navy to develop improved ASW tactics and technology by integrating carrier-based ASW aircraft, land-based patrol aircraft, refitted destroyers, and hunter-killer submarines.
 NATO Undersea Research Centre was established by SACLANT on 2 May 1959 in La Spezia, Italy, to serve as a clearinghouse for NATO's anti-submarine efforts.

Operation Strikeback was the final deployment for the battleships  and  until their re-activation in the 1980s by the Reagan Administration.

In addition to Operation Strikeback, which concentrated on its eastern Atlantic/northern European flank, NATO also conducted two other major military exercises in September 1957, Operation Counter Punch involving Allied Forces Central Europe on the European mainland and Operation Deep Water involving NATO's southern flank in the Mediterranean Sea.

Naval forces for Operation Strikeback
The following is a partial listing of naval forces known to have participated in Operation Strikeback.

Aircraft carriers and embarked air groups
  – Blue Fleet flagship
Carrier Air Group Seven
Fighter Squadron 61 (VF-61)
 Attack Squadron 72 (VA-72)
 Attack Squadron 75 (VA-75)
 All-Weather Attack Squadron 33 (VA(AW)-33) Det.
Light Photographic Squadron 62 (VFP-62) Det.
 Utility Helicopter Squadron 2 (HU-2) Det.

Carrier Air Group One
Fighter Squadron 14 (VF-14)
Fighter Squadron 84 (VF-84)
Attack Squadron 15 (VA-15)
 Attack Squadron 76 (VA-76)
 Heavy Attack Squadron 1 (VAH-1)
 Airborne Early Warning Squadron 12 (VAW-12) Det.
 All-Weather Attack Squadron 33 (AV(AW)-33) Det.
 Utility Helicopter Squadron 2 (HU-2) Det.

Carrier Air Group Six:
Fighter Squadron 33 (VF-33)
 Fighter Squadron 71 (VF-71)
Attack Squadron 25 (VA-25)
 Attack Squadron 66 (VA-66)
 Heavy Attack Squadron 11 (VAH-11)
 All-Weather Attack Squadron 33  (VA(AW)-33) Det.
Light Photographic Squadron 62 (VFP-62) Det.
 Airborne Early Warning Squadron 12 (VAW-12) Det.
 Utility Helicopter Squadron 2 (UH-2) Det.

 Squadrons embarked:
 Air Anti-submarine Squadron 36 (VS-36)
 Anti-submarine Helicopter Squadron 3 (HS-7)
 Utility Helicopter Squadron 2 (HU-2) Det.

 Squadrons embarked:
Air Anti-submarine Squadron 32 (VS-32)
 Anti-submarine Helicopter Squadron 1 (HS-1)
 Attack Squadron 172 (VA-172)
 All-Weather Fighter Squadron 4 (VF(AW)-4) Det.
 Utility Helicopter Squadron 2 (HU-2) Det.

 Squadrons embarked:
Attack Squadron 44 (VA-44)
 Air Anti-submarine Squadron 27 (VS-27)
 Air Anti-submarine Squadron 30 (VS-30)
 Anti-submarine Helicopter Squadron 5 (HS-5)
 Utility Helicopter Squadron 2 (HU-2) Det.
  – Orange Fleet flagship
 Squadrons embarked: 802, 804, 815, 831, 849B, 898

 Squadrons embarked: 820, 845, 849D, 891

 Squadrons embarked: 803, 806, 813, 814, 848A

Naval aircraft

Royal Navy
Fighter
891 Naval Air Squadron de Havilland Sea Venom
894 Naval Air Squadron, Sea Venom
802 Naval Air Squadron, Hawker Sea Hawk
803 Naval Air Squadron, Sea Hawk
804 Naval Air Squadron, Sea Hawk
806 Naval Air Squadron, Sea Hawk
898 Naval Air Squadron, Sea Hawk
torpedo/strike fighter
813 Naval Air Squadron, Westland Wyvern
A/S Warfare
814 Naval Air Squadron, Fairey Gannet
815 Naval Air Squadron, Fairey Gannet
820 Naval Air Squadron, Fairey Gannet
Airborne Early Warning
'A' Flight 849 Naval Air Squadron, Skyraider AEW.1
'B' Flight 849 Naval Air Squadron, Skyraider AEW.1
'D' Flight 849 Naval Air Squadron, Skyraider AEW.1
Helicopters:
845 Naval Air Squadron, Westland Whirlwind:

Aircraft losses

During the subsequent search and rescue, two S2F-2 ASW aircraft of VS-36 off the  collided in mid-air and crashed into the sea. Two additional F4D Skyray aircraft crashed following a mid-air collision off Andøy, Norway. The total loss of life was 11.
The aircraft was lost at sea, but the three-man crew was recovered.

Surface warships

Submarine forces

Naval auxiliaries

Land-based ASW patrol aircraft

U.S. Navy Fleet Air Wing 3
The United States Navy deployed two patrol squadron from Fleet Air Wing Three (FAW-3) to participate in Operation Strikeback:

Patrol Squadron 8 (VP-8) operated out of Argentia, Newfoundland.
Patrol Squadron 10 (VP-10) operated out of Keflavik, Iceland.

Both squadrons flew Lockheed P2V-5F Neptune ASW patrol aircraft.

RAF Coastal Command
The Royal Air Force assigned two squadrons from RAF Coastal Command to participate in Operation Strikeback. Both squadrons flew Avro Shackleton patrol bombers:

No. 204 Squadron deployed to RAF Kinloss
No. 269 Squadron deployed to RAF Wick

U.S. Marine Corps units
The following units of the United States Marine Corps participated in Operation Strikeback in September 1957 are listed below.
Regimental Landing Team 8 (RLT-8)
Battalion Landing Team 1/2

See also

Cold War (1953–1962)
Operation Deep Water
Operation Brasstacks

Notes

References

Bibliography

Lord Ismay, NATO the first five years 1949-1954, North Atlantic Treaty Organisation, 1954

 

 "Emergency Call" Time  —  30 September 1957
 "All Ashore" Time — 7 October 1957
  "Antisubmarine Boss" Time — 7 April 1958
 "The Goblin Killers" Time — 1 September 1958
 A-3 Skywarrior aircraft lost with crew lists, p. 2 A-3 Skywarrior Association
 Descriptive List of Accidents, p. 2 A-3 Skywarrior Association
 Ballykelly's Shackleton Era 1952-1971
 Chronological History — U.S. Naval Communications
 The National Association of Destroyer Veterans
 Loss and Ejections: F4D-1 Skyray - Project Get Out and Walk
 HMCS Iroquois 
 HMS Bulwark - Fleet Air Arm Archives
 GlobalSecurity.org
 Go Navy
 United States Navy Crew Crashes While On NATO Maneuvers In The Atlantic 24 September 1957 - Arlington National Cemetery
 Dictionary of American Naval Aviation Squadrons Volume 1 The History of VA, VAH, VAK, VAL, VAP and VFA Squadrons
 Dictionary of American Naval Aviation Squadrons Volume 2 The History of VP, VPB, VP(H) and VP(AM) Squadrons
 USS Intrepid — Operation Strikeback — Navsource.org
 Senior officials in the NATO military structure, from 1949 to 2001
 History, 1952 - 1963 - No. 269 Squadron RAF
 Sea Story - USS Essex  Association

External links
 GlobalSecurity.org
 Go Navy
 "Trained to 'Strike Back'" - Naval Aviation News - December 1957

Strikeback
1957 in military history
1957 in Europe